The  Nvidia Shield TV (Shield Android TV or just Nvidia Shield) is an Android TV-based digital media player produced by Nvidia as part of its Shield brand of Android devices. First released in May 2015, the Shield was initially marketed by Nvidia as a microconsole, emphasizing its ability to play downloaded games and stream games from a compatible PC on a local network, or via the GeForce Now subscription service. As with all other Android TV devices, it can also stream content from various sources using apps, and also supports 4K resolution video. It is produced in two models, with the second Shield TV Pro model distinguished primarily by increased internal storage.

In 2017, Nvidia released a refreshed version of the 16 GB Shield, which has a smaller form factor that drops MicroSD and infrared support, comes with an updated controller, and is otherwise identical in hardware to the original model. In 2019, Nvidia refreshed the Shield TV lineup with upgraded processors, and revised the base model with a smaller form factor and less internal storage.

Specifications
The Shield utilizes Nvidia's Tegra X1 system-on-chip, based on the ARM Cortex-A57 CPU and Nvidia's Maxwell microarchitecture GPU, with 3 GB of RAM. The device supports 4K resolution output at 60 FPS over an HDMI 2.0 output, with support for HEVC-encoded video. The Shield can either contain 16 GB of internal flash storage or a 500 GB hard drive, expandable via microSD card or removable storage. 2015 and 2017 Shield models with a 500 GB hard drive are branded as Shield Pro. It contains two USB ports. For internet connections, it supports gigabit Ethernet and 802.11ac Wi-Fi. The console ships with one wireless controller; a wireless micro-USB-rechargeable remote with voice control and a headphone jack is sold separately but is no longer available from official channels.

The Shield runs Android TV; games optimized and ported for the device are offered through a separate Shield Store app. The device can also stream games through Nvidia's on-demand subscription cloud gaming service, GeForce Now (formerly Nvidia GRID), and from a local computer using the GameStream function of supported Nvidia graphics cards via the GeForce Experience application. In addition to native Android gaming and game streaming, retro gaming emulation is popular on the Nvidia Shield TV.

On January 16, 2017, Nvidia announced Shield Experience Upgrade 5.0, which is based on Android 7.0 "Nougat". It adds software features from the updated 2017 model, including HDR support for 4K video, new apps (including Amazon Video), SmartThings integration, Google Assistant support, and a new Nvidia Games interface. Google Assistant support requires a new iteration of the Shield Controller. In June 2018, Nvidia released an update to Android 8.0 "Oreo".

On June 23 2021, an update of Android TV to Google TV made Google Stadia available for the 2019 versions of Nvidia Shield TV and Nvidia Shield TV Pro.

2017 version 
On January 16, 2017, Nvidia unveiled a refreshed version of the 16 GB Shield. It has a revised form factor with a smaller size but no microSD slot, and is supplied with Shield Experience Upgrade 5.0. A revised Bluetooth remote control with no headphone jack and replaceable CR2032 battery is now bundled, as well as an updated controller with an always-on microphone. The 2017 model contains the same Tegra X1 system-on-chip as the 2015 model. The 2017 Shield replaced the original 16 GB version. Nvidia continues to market the larger, 500 GB Shield Pro model.

2019 version 
On October 28, 2019, Nvidia unveiled two new Shield TV models. Both models use the Tegra X1+ system-on-chip, ship with Android 9.0 "Pie", support Dolby Atmos and Dolby Vision, and include an updated remote control, and a new "AI-enhanced" upscaling system that can upscale high-definition video to 4K resolution. The new base model uses a cylindrical form factor rather than a set-top box style, and has 2 GB of RAM and 8 GB of flash storage, expandable via MicroSD card (in place of USB ports). The Shield TV Pro uses the same set-top box form factor as the previous model, and includes 3 GB of RAM, 16 GB of flash storage, and two full-size USB 3.0 ports. A gamepad is no longer included.

Models

See also
 List of microconsoles
 History of video game consoles (eighth generation)
 Shield Portable
 Shield Tablet

References

External links
Official website

Android (operating system) devices
Android-based video game consoles
Computer-related introductions in 2015
ARM-based video game consoles
Eighth-generation video game consoles
Microconsoles
Nvidia products
Portable media players
Set-top box